Caecilia antioquiaensis, the Antioquia caecilian, is a species of caecilian in the family Caeciliidae. It is endemic to Colombia and only known from its type locality in the Cordillera Central in Valdivia, Antioquia. It is a poorly known subterranean species, occurring in humid tropical forest.

References

antioquiaensis
Amphibians described in 1968
Amphibians of Colombia
Endemic fauna of Colombia
Taxa named by Edward Harrison Taylor
Taxonomy articles created by Polbot